Sankalp Vohra (born 24 August 1983) is an Indian cricketer. He has played 13 First class, 20 List A and 4 Twenty20 matches. He took most wickets in the 2005–06 Vijay Hazare Trophy, India's domestic 50 over tournament.

References

External links
 

1983 births
Living people
Indian cricketers
Baroda cricketers